The large vesper mouse (Calomys callosus) is a South American rodent species of the family Cricetidae.

It is found in Argentina, Bolivia, Brazil and Paraguay.

Its karyotype has 2n = 50 and FN = 66. It was formerly synonymized with C. expulsus, but the latter has 2n = 66 and FN = 68.

It is particularly notable as the vector of Bolivian hemorrhagic fever.

References

Calomys
Mammals of Argentina
Mammals of Bolivia
Mammals of Brazil
Mammals of Paraguay
Rodents of South America
Mammals described in 1830
Taxa named by Johann Rudolph Rengger